Mary D. Waters (born August 27, 1955) is an American politician who served for three terms as a member of the Michigan House of Representatives.

Early life and education
Waters was born on August 27, 1955. Waters attended the Detroit Business Institute. She earned a Bachelor of Arts from the University of Michigan, where she studied communications and behavioral sciences.

Career
On November 7, 2000, Waters was elected to the Michigan House of Representatives where she represented the 4th district from January 10, 2001 to 2006. Waters served as the Minority Floor Leader for the state House from 2003 to 2006, being the first African-American woman to serve as Democratic floor leader in the chamber. Waters left office in 2006 due to term limits. In 2021, Waters won an at-large seat on the Detroit City Council.

References

Living people
1955 births
Baptists from Michigan
Detroit Business Institute alumni
University of Michigan alumni
Women state legislators in Michigan
African-American women in politics
African-American state legislators in Michigan
Democratic Party members of the Michigan House of Representatives
20th-century African-American women
20th-century African-American people
21st-century African-American women
21st-century African-American politicians
21st-century American women politicians
21st-century American politicians